The Elevation of Holy Cross Church is a historic Russian Orthodox church in South Naknek, Alaska.  It is a small building, roughly similar in size to the 1886 St. John the Baptist Chapel in Naknek, prior to its 1914 enlargement. Now it is under Diocese of Alaska of the Orthodox Church in America

Near the vestibule is a rack containing two medium-sized bells, which are rung from within the building by lanyards. The building resembles a schoolhouse, except for its modest exterior religious symbols.

The church was listed on the National Register of Historic Places in 1980.

See also
National Register of Historic Places listings in Bristol Bay Borough, Alaska

References

Buildings and structures on the National Register of Historic Places in Bristol Bay Borough, Alaska
Churches on the National Register of Historic Places in Alaska
Russian Orthodox church buildings in Alaska